Prism International (styled PRISM international) is a magazine published quarterly in Vancouver, British Columbia, Canada. Established in 1959, it is Western Canada's senior literary magazine. The magazine was started with name Prism and five years later its name changed to Prism International. The focus of the magazine is contemporary fiction and poetry, but it also publishes drama and creative non-fiction.

The rendering of the name is idiosyncratic: "PRISM" is intentionally all upper-case and "international" is all lower case.

References

External links
 

1959 establishments in British Columbia
Literary magazines published in Canada
Magazines established in 1959
Magazines published in Vancouver
Quarterly magazines published in Canada